Tanjung Balai Karimun (Jawi:) often abbreviated Tg. Balai, is the main town at the southern end of the Great Karimun Island (Pulau Karimunbesar), part of the Karimun Regency within the Riau Islands Province of Indonesia.  It is often called Tanjung Balai Karimun to distinguish it from Tanjungbalai (city), situated in the Asahan Regency.

Transport 
It has a port by the same name that has services to Sumatran port/city of Dumai, crossing the Strait of Malacca as well as to Singapore crossing the Straits of Singapore.

The city is served by Sei Bati Airport, which has regular flights to and from Pekanbaru three times weekly.

Climate
Tanjung Balai Karimun has a tropical rainforest climate (Af) with heavy rainfall year-round.

References 

Strait of Malacca
Geography of the Riau Islands
Regency seats of the Riau Islands